The Haverfordwest transmitting station is a broadcasting and telecommunications facility located at Woodstock about  to the north east of the town of Haverfordwest, in Pembrokeshire, Wales. It was originally built by the BBC, entering service in early 1964 acting as a main transmitter for the 405-line VHF television system, and as a repeater for Band 2 VHF FM radio received off-air from Blaenplwyf transmitting station. It is now owned and operated by Arqiva.

The radio broadcasts cover the majority of Pembrokeshire, except the north eastern part of the county. The signals also can reach the outskirts of Cardiff and the Vale of Glamorgan.

It currently carries seven analogue FM radio stations, including BBC Radio 1, BBC Radio 2, BBC Radio 3, BBC Radio 4, BBC Radio Cymru, BBC Radio Wales and Radio Pembrokeshire.

It currently carries three digital television multiplexes at twice the ERP of the analogue services that they replaced, thus providing digital TV to a much larger area than had been served before.

The mast had its aircraft warning lights upgraded in October 2006, from white xenon discharge flashers to red lamps employing arrays of ultrabright LEDs.

Services listed by frequency

Analogue television

17 February 1964 - January 1985

January 1985 - 18 July 1990
The 405-line VHF television system closed down permanently across the UK, and from then until Summer 1990, the site transmitted no television signals, just VHF radio.

18 July 1990 - 19 August 2009
Colour TV was added very late: Haverfordwest became a UHF relay of Presely. Being in Wales, this transmitter radiated the S4C variant of Channel 4.

Analogue and digital television

19 August 2009 - 16 September 2009
Digital Switchover started at Haverfordwest, mirroring the changes at its parent transmitter at Presely. BBC2 closed on channel 66 and HTV Wales switched to that channel for its final three weeks of service. The BBC multiplex A started up on channel 56 vacated by ITV.

Digital television

16 September 2009 - 31 October 2012
All the remaining analogue TV services closed and were replaced with the standard three multiplexes of Freeview Lite. Notice that unusually, the digital TV services are broadcast at twice the ERP that had been provided in the analogue TV days. At most sites, the digital services are broadcast at a fifth the ERP of the old analogue channels.

31 October 2012 - present
As a side-effect of frequency-changes elsewhere in the region to do with clearance of the 800 MHz band for 4G mobile phone use, Haverfordwest's "BBC B" multiplex was moved from channel 48 to channel 47. Additionally, all the transmissions at the site gained a +3 dB power boost.

Analogue radio (FM VHF)

See also
List of masts
List of radio stations in the United Kingdom
List of tallest buildings and structures in Great Britain

References

External links
 MB21's page on BBC 405 TV to Wales and the West
 405 Alive's list of transmitters"
 More details on 405-line BBC transmitters
 The Transmission Gallery: Photographs and Information
 The Transmission Gallery: FM Coverage Map

Buildings and structures in Pembrokeshire
Transmitter sites in Wales